Turkish fear   or the Turkish scare is a popular expression in historiography to signify fatalistic and apocalyptic societal sentiments in Central Europe, and especially in Italy and Germany, after the Conquest of Constantinople, and especially in the 16th-17th centuries during the peak of the Ottoman Empire between the two Battles of Mohács - in 1526 and 1687 and the two Battles of Vienna - to the very end of the so-called Great Turkish War.

In the 16th century about 2500 printed works were published for the Turks in Europe (more than 1000 of them in German). In these publications, the image of the "Bloodthirsty Turk" is at the forefront. In addition, between 1480 and 1610, twice as many books were printed on the Turkish threat to Europe than on the opening of the New World.

See also
 Ottoman wars in Europe

References 

History of the Ottoman Empire
History of Europe by period